Heather Bowie Young (born March 23, 1975) is an American professional golfer who played on the LPGA Tour. She played under her maiden name, Heather Bowie, until her marriage in 2006, and is also referred to as Heather Young.

Bowie was born in Washington, D.C. She played college golf at Arizona State University, playing on two NCAA Women's Division I Championship teams in 1994 and 1995. She transferred to the University of Texas and won the NCAA Women's Division I Individual Championship in 1997. While at Texas, she was named the winner of the Honda Broderick Award (now the Honda Sports Award) for golf. She won the Edith Cummings Munson Golf Award in 1995 for her golfing and academic success.

Bowie turned professional in 1997 and played on the Futures Tour in  1998 and 1999.

Bowie joined the LPGA Tour in 2000 and has won once on Tour in 2005.

Bowie played on the U.S. team in the 2003 Solheim Cup.

Professional wins (1)

LPGA Tour wins (1)

LPGA Tour playoff record (1–0)

Team appearances
Professional
Solheim Cup (representing the United States): 2003

References

External links

American female golfers
Arizona State Sun Devils women's golfers
Texas Longhorns women's golfers
LPGA Tour golfers
Solheim Cup competitors for the United States
Golfers from Washington, D.C.
1975 births
Living people